The Ft. Smith Confederate Monument stands on the grounds of the Sebastian County Courthouse at the junction of 6th and Rogers Streets in Fort Smith, Arkansas. The statue depicts a Confederate Army soldier, standing facing north, holding the upper stock of his rifle, which is grounded. The monument was placed in 1903 with funding raised by the local chapter of the Daughters of the Confederacy. An earlier Confederate memorial, placed at Fort Smith National Cemetery, was destroyed by a tornado, and the federal government objected to the placement of this memorial there without alterations to also commemorate the Union dead. The city granted permission for its placement at its current location.

The monument was listed on the National Register of Historic Places in 1993.

See also
National Register of Historic Places listings in Sebastian County, Arkansas

References

Buildings and structures completed in 1903
Buildings and structures in Fort Smith, Arkansas
Confederate States of America monuments and memorials in Arkansas
Historic district contributing properties in Arkansas
Monuments and memorials on the National Register of Historic Places in Arkansas
National Register of Historic Places in Sebastian County, Arkansas
Neoclassical architecture in Arkansas
1903 establishments in Arkansas